"Random" is a song by American rapper G-Eazy. It was released on October 29, 2015 as a promotional single off his second studio album, When It's Dark Out.
The song was produced by OZ.

Track listing
Digital download
"Random"3:00

Music video
On October 30, 2015 G-Eazy uploaded the audio for "Random" on his YouTube and Vevo account.

Charts

Certifications

References

External links

2015 singles
2015 songs
G-Eazy songs
RCA Records singles
Songs with music by Bert Kaempfert
Songs written by Carl Sigman
Songs written by G-Eazy
Songs written by Oz (record producer)